Je t’aime (a French phrase meaning "I love you") may refer to:

Je t'aime, je t'aime, je t'aime, a 1974 album by Johnny Hallyday
 "Je t'aime, je t'aime, je t'aime" (song), the title song from the above album
"Je T'Aime" (Psychic TV song), 1985 & 1989 singles attributed to pseudonyms for band Psychic TV
, a Lara Fabian song on Pure, which won the Most Popular Song Of the Year Félix Award of 1998
"Je T'Aime", a 2007 song by Kelly Sweet
"Je t'aime", 2008 single by Armand Van Helden
"Je t'aime", a 2010 anime short film by Mamoru Oshii
"Je t'aime" (Capital T song), a 2020 song by Capital T
"Je T'aime", a 2021 pre-release single of the extended play Hello by Joy

See also
"Je t'aime... moi non plus", French duet written by Serge Gainsbourg, sung with lovers Brigitte Bardot in 1967 and Jane Birkin in 1969.
Je t'aime moi non plus (film), Gainsbourg's 1976 film based on the song, with Birkin in the female lead and Gérard Depardieu in a cameo
Paris, je t'aime, 2006 anthology film, with Depardieu as one of its 22 directors